Iris Browser is a discontinued web browser for Windows Mobile smartphones and personal digital assistants (PDAs) developed by the Torch Mobile company. The first version was released in 2008. It was one of the first mobile browsers to score a perfect 100 on the Acid3 test.

RIM acquired Torch Mobile in 2009 and discontinued Iris.

Features
Iris is based on the WebKit rendering engine
with SquirrelFish Extreme, Netscape plug-in API and JavaScript/ECMAScript 1.5.

It has advanced HTML and CSS support and SVG, XPath, and XSLT support.

It supports a customizable interface and touch screen control, pop-up blockers, and XHTML 1.x mobile profile support.

It has advanced security features, advanced mobile key navigation, HTTP cache optimized for low disk usage, History Auto-Complete and SSL and authenticated proxy support.

Performance
According to independent testing, Iris 1.1.5 loads pages more slowly than its closest competitor, Opera Mobile. The UI was greatly enhanced all the way up until 1.1.9 which was released on July 6, 2009.

According to testing done by Torch Mobile, Iris 1.1.2 outperformed Access NetFront 3.5 and Opera Mobile 9.5 in the SunSpider Javascript benchmark."

References

BlackBerry Limited
Mobile web browsers
Pocket PC software
Software based on WebKit